Hands Across the Void is the first full-length album released by Tiny Vipers after signing with Sub Pop Records.  It was released July 24, 2007.

Track listing
All songs written by Jesy Fortino.
 "Campfire Resemblance" – 4:35
 "On This Side" – 5:42
 "Aron" – 3:01
 "Forest on Fire" – 6:22
 "Shipwreck" - 3:24
 "Swastika" - 10:47
 "The Downward" - 8:13
 "Fell in a Well" - 5:22 (iTunes Bonus Track)

References

2007 albums
Tiny Vipers albums
Sub Pop albums